Teatro Lauro Rossi is a theatre and opera house in Macerata inaugurated in 1774 with a setting of the libretto L'Olimpiade by Pasquale Anfossi. It was renamed in honour of local composer Lauro Rossi in 1884, the year before the composer's death. The Teatro Lauro Rossi is now one of the venues employed by Sferisterio – Macerata Opera Festival.

References

Opera houses in Italy